Patrick J. Snyder (born October 10, 1956) is an American politician.

From Milwaukee, Wisconsin, Snyder went to University of Iowa. In 2000, Snyder worked for WSAU (AM). He then worked for United States Representative Sean Duffy as a field representative. He lived in Schofield, Wisconsin. In 2017, Snyder served in the Wisconsin State Assembly and is a Republican.

Notes

1956 births
Living people
People from Boone, Iowa
People from Schofield, Wisconsin
Politicians from Milwaukee
University of Iowa alumni
Republican Party members of the Wisconsin State Assembly
21st-century American politicians